Begum Shafiq Zia (née Shafiq Jahan; 21 September 1931 – 5 January 1996) was a Pakistani public figure who served as the First Lady of Pakistan from 1977 until her husband's death in a plane crash on 17 August 1988.

Early life and family
Begum Zia was born in 1931 in Kampala, Uganda, to a family of Punjabi descent; she moved to Pakistan after the partition of India, and married General Zia-ul-Haq on 10 August 1950 in Lahore. Shafiq was eight years younger than her husband, and was related to him on her maternal side. Her father, a medical doctor who lived and worked in Kampala, had taken leave at the time and was in Pakistan so that he could arrange the marriages of both his daughters.

After the 1977 coup and her husband's assumption of the presidency in 1978, Zia became first lady. Over the next decade, she accompanied her husband on several overseas trips, including a state visit to the United States in 1982.

As First Lady

Upon assuming the presidency in 1978, the Zia family continued residing at the Army House in Rawalpindi, but hosted official functions and state dinners at the newly-completed Aiwan-i-Sadr. Begum Zia's work as First Lady of Pakistan focused on domestic initiatives pertaining to the welfare of disabled persons and the problems of drug addiction and abuse among young people. In 1981, the Zia government passed the Disabled Persons' (Employment and Rehabilitation) Ordinance, which created national and provincial councils to formulate policy for the employment and welfare of those with disabilities, established training centres, set employment quotas and called for the creation of a federal fund for the disbursement of stipends and scholarships for disabled persons. Begum and President Zia's own child, youngest daughter Zain, was born with speech and hearing disabilities.

In 1985, Begum Zia represented Pakistan at Nancy Reagan's First Ladies Conference on Drug Abuse among seventeen other first ladies. Addressing the conference, she noted that the government of Pakistan had established twenty-six centres for the rehabilitation of addicts. Begum Zia was invited to the United Nations that same year, where, at a second meeting attended by the first ladies of thirty nations, she called for holding a conference in a developing country where drug use could be studied in the context of poverty. Upon returning to Pakistan, she enlisted the cooperation of nongovernmental organizations in tackling the domestic drug abuse problem, and inaugurated the 1986 national conference of NGOs on drug abuse prevention in Karachi. Begum Zia's work was featured in a United States Information Agency film, along with that of Marly Sarney of Brazil, Queen Sirikit of Thailand, Queen Noor of Jordan, and Queen Silvia of Sweden.

Begum Zia was present at the inaugural session of the first SAARC summit in Dhaka, Bangladesh alongside the wives of other SAARC heads of state. In 1987, she accompanied President Zia to Jaipur for his famous cricket diplomacy visit, where she met with Gayatri Devi.

Begum Zia's charitable and humanitarian work was recognised by Aga Khan IV in 1985, who, at the inauguration of the Aga Khan University Hospital, endowed scholarships for medical students and funds to support health care for the poor at the hospital in Begum Zia's name. In 1987, King Hussein of Jordan presented her with the Supreme Order of the Renaissance.

Later life and death
Following Zia-ul-Haq's death in 1988, Begum Zia founded the Zia-ul-Haq Foundation. In 1989, her pension and privileges as the wife of a former president were revoked by the Benazir Bhutto government. She died on 5 January 1996 at the Cromwell Hospital in London and is survived by three daughters, Rubina, Quratulain, and Zain, and two sons, Ijaz and Anwar.

Foreign honours

 : Supreme Order of the Renaissance

Eponyms

 Dendrobium orchid Shafiq Zia-ul-Haq, Singapore Botanical Gardens (1983) 
 Begum Shafiq Zia-ul-Haq Scholarship, Aga Khan University (1985)

References

1931 births
Ugandan people of Indian descent
1996 deaths
People from Kampala
Spouses of presidents of Pakistan
Ugandan people of Pakistani descent
Ugandan emigrants to Pakistan
Ugandan people of Punjabi descent